St. Louis and San Francisco Railroad Building, also known as the Frisco Building, is a historic train station and office building located at Joplin, Jasper County, Missouri.  It was built in 1913 for the St. Louis and San Francisco Railroad, and is a nine-story, "L"-shaped, brick and stone trimmed building with a decorative cornice.  It measures approximately 101 feet by 127 feet and has a two-part vertical block form. 

It was listed on the National Register of Historic Places in 2002.  It is located in the Joplin Downtown Historic District.

References

Individually listed contributing properties to historic districts on the National Register in Missouri
Commercial buildings on the National Register of Historic Places in Missouri
Railway stations on the National Register of Historic Places in Missouri
Commercial buildings completed in 1913
Buildings and structures in Joplin, Missouri
National Register of Historic Places in Jasper County, Missouri
Joplin
Former railway stations in Missouri